Greenblatt or Greenblat (Yiddish: "green leaf") is a surname. Notable people with the surname include:

Ariana Greenblatt, child actress of Stuck in the Middle
C. H. Greenblatt (born 1972), writer and storyboard artist, most notably for SpongeBob SquarePants, and creator of Chowder, Harvey Beaks, and Jellystone!.
Evelyn Greenblatt Howren, nee Evelyn Greenblatt, American woman aviator and WASP
Jack Greenblatt, Canadian scientist
James Marshall, actor, born James David Greenblatt
Jason Greenblatt (born 1967), American lawyer, United States Special Representative for International Negotiations
Joel Greenblatt, American financier
Jonathan Greenblatt, co-founder, Ethos Water; director, Anti-Defamation League.
Richard Greenblatt (programmer), American computer programmer
Richard Greenblatt (playwright), Canadian actor/playwright
Robert Greenblatt, television executive and chairman of NBC Entertainment
Rodney Greenblat, American graphic artist
Sherwin Greenblatt - co-founder, Bose
Shon Greenblatt, American actor
Stephen Greenblatt, New Historicist literary critic and theorist

Jewish surnames
Yiddish-language surnames

de:Greenblatt